Freeway Insurance Services America, LLC, or Freeway Insurance, is an American insurance agency with over 500 retail locations in the United States. The company sells primarily non-standard auto insurance, which is required for new and higher risk drivers. The company's headquarters is in Huntington Beach, California.

History 
Freeway Insurance was founded in 1987 by Kelly Turton in Orange County, California. Initially, the company’s focus was private passenger automobile insurance, which was then acquired by Westline Corp., which was then acquired by Confie, one of the largest privately held insurance brokers in the United States and a portfolio company of private equity firm ABRY Partners, in 2008. Freeway Insurance has expanded through acquisitions made by Confie, including Colyer Insurance, DeFranco Insurance, CW Baker Insurance, and Lewiston Insurance.

In 2021, Freeway Insurance became a sponsor for Trackhouse Racing Team’s No. 99 Chevrolet Camaro, driven by Daniel Suarez in the NASCAR Cup Series. Freeway Insurance has also partnered with the California DMV to register and document vehicles.

In April 2021, Alliant insurance agreed to buy Confie, which includes Freeway Insurance.

Operations 
Freeway predominantly sells within the non-standard auto insurance market. As of 2020, it sells home owners and renter’s insurance, health insurance, and motorcycle insurance. Freeway Insurance also provides insurance to high-risk drivers with poor driving records. There are 503 Freeway Insurance locations in the United States, with retail offices in 22 states.

Since 2008, Freeway Insurance has operated in English and Spanish, and nearly 50% of its customers identify themselves as Hispanic or Latino. Freeway reports that nearly 70 percent of their insurance agents are multilingual. Freeway predominantly sells within the non-standard auto insurance market.

In 2021, Freeway Insurance announced they would begin offering franchise opportunities to further develop their retail locations in the United States.

Sponsorships 

In 2021, Freeway Insurance began a motorsports sponsorship with a partnership with Trackhouse Racing and NASCAR driver Daniel Suárez. In February 2022, Freeway Insurance announced it would be the primary sponsor of Daniel Suárez for five events during the 2022 NASCAR Cup Series.

Freeway Insurance has also been an official partner of the LA Galaxy Major League Soccer team since 2021.

References 

American companies established in 1987
Insurance companies of the United States
Financial services companies based in California
Privately held companies based in California